This is a list of supermarket chains in Norway,

Defunct chains

Notes

References

Supermarkets
Supermarkets
Norway